Otto Hjalmar Granfelt (15 November 1874 in Turku — 25 June 1957 in Turku) was a Finnish legal scholar, professor and politician. He served as Minister of Justice from 28 June 1920 to 9 April 1921. He was a member of the Swedish People's Party of Finland (SFP).

References

1874 births
1957 deaths
Politicians from Turku
People from Turku and Pori Province (Grand Duchy of Finland)
Swedish People's Party of Finland politicians
Ministers of Justice of Finland
Finnish legal scholars
University of Helsinki alumni
Academic staff of the University of Helsinki